The Brian May Band was an English-American rock band formed by Queen guitarist Brian May for touring in promotion of his studio albums.

History
The rhythm section for the band were Cozy Powell and Neil Murray, who had previously worked together in Black Sabbath and Whitesnake. Spike Edney, who was the tour keyboardist for Queen between 1984 and 1986 took the keyboard spot.

The band was originally formed in October 1991 for May's performance at Guitar Legends guitar festival in Seville, Spain. The band soon went on a tour of the United States, Europe and Japan. The tour ended in December 1993, when May returned to the studio with fellow Queen bandmates Roger Taylor and John Deacon for Queen's final studio album, Made In Heaven. Meanwhile, Cozy Powell and Neil Murray returned to work with Black Sabbath, and both later joined Peter Green's Band.

The band reunited in 1998 to promote Brian May's Another World album. Eric Singer, of later KISS fame, was brought as the last minute replacement for Cozy Powell, who had died in a car accident earlier that year.

In 2005, both Jamie Moses and Spike Edney joined the Queen + Paul Rodgers collaboration on their worldwide tour.

The band's only release was the live album, Live at the Brixton Academy in 1993. Several live tracks were also released on "Resurrection" single and Red Special mini-album.

After the band's tours in 1993 and 1998, members went on to contribute to various projects. Most notably, Moses, Edney, Murray and Powell formed the original line up of the SAS (Spike's All Stars) Band, a band which was also joined by Susie Webb and Zoe Nicholas on later tours, and which Edney and Moses still perform with.

Discography
Live at the Brixton Academy (1994)

Touring Band

Members for the 1992 South American Tour:
Drums: Cozy Powell
Guitar: Mike Caswell
Keyboards, backing vocals: Spike Edney
Bass: Neil Murray
Backing Vocalists: Maggie Ryder, Miriam Stockley and Chris Thompson

Members for the 1993 'Back To The Light' World Tour: 
Drums: Cozy Powell
Guitar, backing vocals: Jamie Moses
Keyboards, backing vocals: Spike Edney
Bass: Neil Murray
Backing Vocalists: Catherine Porter and Shelley Preston

Members for the 1998 'Another World' World Tour: 
Drums: Eric Singer
Guitar, backing vocals: Jamie Moses
Keyboards, backing vocals: Spike Edney
Bass: Neil Murray
Backing Vocals: Susie Webb and Zoe Nicholas

Timeline

References

English rock music groups
Brian May
Musical groups established in 1991
Musical groups disestablished in 1998
1991 establishments in England